Dmitry Sergeyevich Klimov (born 16 May 1983) is a Russian professional association football coach and a former player. He is the goalkeepers' coach at FC Akron Tolyatti.

Playing career
He played  in the Russian Football National League for FC Mordovia Saransk in 2007.

References

External links
 

1983 births
Footballers from Voronezh
Living people
Russian footballers
Association football goalkeepers
FC Fakel Voronezh players
FC Krasnodar players
FC Mordovia Saransk players
FC Orenburg players